The Dubai Sevens is played annually as part of the IRB Sevens World Series for international rugby sevens (seven-a-side version of rugby union). The 2006 competition, which took place on December 1 and 2 at the Dubai Exiles ground, was the first Cup trophy in the 2006-07 IRB Sevens World Series.

Teams

Pool stages

Pool A
{| class="wikitable" style="text-align: center;"
|-
!width="200"|Team
!width="40"|Pld
!width="40"|W
!width="40"|D
!width="40"|L
!width="40"|PF
!width="40"|PA
!width="40"|+/-
!width="40"|Pts
|-
|align=left| 
|3||2||0||1||95||19||+76||7 
|-
|align=left| 
|3||2||0||1||53||33||+20||7 
|-
|align=left| 
|3||2||0||1||41||46||-5||7
|-
|align=left| 
|3||0||0||3||7||98||-91||3
|}

Pool B
{| class="wikitable" style="text-align: center;"
|-
!width="200"|Team
!width="40"|Pld
!width="40"|W
!width="40"|D
!width="40"|L
!width="40"|PF
!width="40"|PA
!width="40"|+/-
!width="40"|Pts
|-
|align=left| 
|3||3||0||0||86||10||+76||9 
|-
|align=left| 
|3||1||0||2||38||52||-14||5 
|-
|align=left| 
|3||1||0||2||36||55||-19||5
|-
|align=left| 
|3||1||0||2||33||76||-43||5
|}

Pool C
{| class="wikitable" style="text-align: center;"
|-
!width="200"|Team
!width="40"|Pld
!width="40"|W
!width="40"|D
!width="40"|L
!width="40"|PF
!width="40"|PA
!width="40"|+/-
!width="40"|Pts
|-
|align=left| 
|3||3||0||0||120||24||+96||9 
|-
|align=left| 
|3||2||0||1||52||78||-26||7 
|-
|align=left| 
|3||1||0||2||50||64||-14||5
|-
|align=left| 
|3||0||0||3||36||92||-56||3
|}

Pool D
{| class="wikitable" style="text-align: center;"
|-
!width="200"|Team
!width="40"|Pld
!width="40"|W
!width="40"|D
!width="40"|L
!width="40"|PF
!width="40"|PA
!width="40"|+/-
!width="40"|Pts
|-
|align=left| 
|3||2||0||1||92||22||+70||7 
|-
|align=left| 
|3||2||0||1||78||24||+54||7 
|-
|align=left| 
|3||2||0||1||76||45||+31||7
|-
|align=left| 
|3||0||0||3||0||155||-155||3
|}

Finals

Shield

Bowl

Plate

Cup

Round 1 table

External links
 Dubai Rugby 7s
 
  on irbsevens.com
 Dubai Sevens Profile on UR7s.com

2006
2006–07 IRB Sevens World Series
2006 in Emirati sport
2006 in Asian rugby union